Class Dismissed may refer to:

 Class Dismissed (TV series), a British children's sketch comedy series
 Class Dismissed, a New York Times documentary on the life of Pakistani child Malala Yousafzai under the Taliban
 Class Dismissed, original title of the American adult animated television series Sit Down, Shut Up